Dana T. Merrill (October 15, 1876 – August 3, 1957) was a career officer in the United States Army. A veteran of the Spanish–American War and World War I, Merrill attained the rank of brigadier general, and was most notable as the World War I chief of staff for the 37th Division, and the commander of the 10th Infantry Regiment, three infantry brigades, and two corps areas.

A native of East Auburn, Maine, Merrill graduated from the University of Maine in 1898 and enlisted in a Maine volunteer unit during the Spanish–American War. Later that year, he was commissioned as a second lieutenant, and he served in the Philippines during the Philippine–American War. Merrill continued to work his way up the ranks during the period prior to World War I, and graduated from the Army School of the Line and the Command and General Staff College.

During World War I, Merrill was chief of staff for the 37th Division. He took part in numerous engagements and battles in France, and received several US and foreign decorations. He remained in the Army after the war, and graduated from the Army War College in 1920. He commanded the 10th Infantry Regiment from 1924 to 1927, and in the 1930s, his command assignments included the 10th Infantry Brigade, 12th Infantry Brigade, Washington Provisional Brigade, Sixth Corps Area, and Fifth Corps Area. Merrill retired from the Army upon reaching the mandatory retirement age of 64 in 1940.

During World War II, Merrill was the Civil Defense Coordinator for the greater Cincinnati area, including southern Ohio and northern Kentucky. He died at his home in Fort Thomas, Kentucky on August 3, 1957 and was buried at Mount Auburn Cemetery in Auburn, Maine.

Early life
Dana True Merrill was born in East Auburn, Maine on October 15, 1876, the son of Daniel Cummings Merrill and Mary Adelaide (Noyes) Merrill. His siblings included Elmer Drew Merrill, who was his twin. Merrill was educated in East Auburn, and graduated from the University of Maine with a Bachelor of Science degree in 1898.  In 1901, the Sigma Alpha Epsilon fraternity founded a chapter at the University of Maine, and Merrill was initiated as a charter member.

Start of career
In May 1898, Merrill enlisted for the Spanish–American War as a member of Company H, 1st Maine Volunteer Infantry Regiment. In September 1898, he received a regular Army commission as a second lieutenant of Infantry, and his initial assignments included command of Company A, 12th Infantry Regiment during combat in the Philippine–American War. In 1908, Merrill graduated from the Army School of the Line, and he was a 1909 graduate of the Command and General Staff College.

Continued career

Merrill continued his Army career after the war, and served with the 7th, 23rd, 28th, 10th, and 3rd Infantry Regiments. He was promoted to first lieutenant in 1899, captain in 1905, major in May 1917, lieutenant colonel (National Army) in August 1917, and colonel (National Army) in July 1918.

During World War I, Merrill served in France as chief of staff of the 37th Division. In 1920, Merrill reverted to his permanent rank of lieutenant colonel, and he was promoted to colonel later that year. He graduated from the Army War College in 1920.

From 1924 to 1927 was commander of the 10th Infantry Regiment and Fort Thomas, Kentucky.

Later career
In 1933, Merrill was appointed to command the 10th Infantry Brigade, a unit of the 5th Infantry Division at Fort Benjamin Harrison, Indiana. From 1933 to 1935, he again commanded the 10th Infantry Regiment and Fort Thomas. In 1935, he was promoted to brigadier general, and from 1935 to 1937, Merrill was commander of Fort Sheridan, Illinois and the 12th Infantry Brigade, a unit of the 6th Infantry Division. From May to September 1936, he was acting commander of the Sixth Corps Area and the Second United States Army.

From 1937 to 1938, he commanded the Washington Provisional Brigade, a unit based in Washington, DC.  In 1938, Merrill was named to commanded of Fort Benjamin Harrison, Indiana, the 10th Infantry Brigade, and the Indiana Civilian Conservation Corps District, In 1939, he was assigned to command the Fifth Corps Area at Fort Benjamin Harrison. Merrill retired from the Army in 1940.

World War II
During World War II, Merrill was the Civil Defense Coordinator for the greater Cincinnati area.

Awards and decorations
Merrill's awards included the Army Distinguished Service Medal, the Croix de Guerre from Belgium, and the Croix de Guerre and Legion of Honor (Officer) from France. In addition, he was appointed an officer of Belgium's Order of Leopold.

Death and burial
Merrill died in Fort Thomas, Kentucky on August 3, 1957. He was buried at Mount Auburn Cemetery in Auburn, Maine.

Family
In 1903, Merrill and Edith Ferry (1880–1953) were married in Grand Haven, Michigan. She was the daughter of Edward Payson Ferry and Clara V. (White) Ferry. Senator Thomas W. Ferry was her uncle and W. Mont Ferry was her brother. William Montague Ferry was her grandfather.

The children of Dana Merrill and Edith Ferry Merrill included sons Harwood F. and Dana Noyes, and daughter Virginia True.

References

Sources

Books

Newspapers

Internet

External links
 
 

1876 births
1957 deaths
People from Auburn, Maine
University of Maine alumni
United States Army Command and General Staff College alumni
United States Army War College alumni
United States Army generals
American military personnel of the Spanish–American War
United States Army personnel of World War I
Recipients of the Distinguished Service Medal (US Army)
Recipients of the Croix de Guerre 1914–1918 (France)
Recipients of the Croix de guerre (Belgium)
Recipients of the Legion of Honour
Burials in Maine
Military personnel from Maine